The 1985–86 season was Newport County's sixth consecutive season in the Third Division and their 58th season overall in the Football League.

Season review

Results summary 
Note: Three points for a win

Results by round

Fixtures and results

Third Division

FA Cup

Football League Cup

Welsh Cup

League table

External links
 Newport County 1985-1986 : Results
 Newport County football club match record: 1986
 WELSH CUP 1985/86

1985-86
English football clubs 1985–86 season
Welsh football clubs 1985–86 season
Newport County F.C.